Jean-Charles Allavena (born October 18, 1960) is a Monegasque politician. He was elected to the National Council in the 2013 Monegasque election as a member for the ruling coalition, Horizon Monaco. He is the leader of the conservative party Rally & Issues, which is the largest constituent party of the ruling coalition.

External links
 Biography on the National Council website

Monegasque politicians
Living people
1960 births